Delitiae Musicae is an Italian classical instrumental and vocal ensemble. There is no relation to the Spanish lute duo Delitiae Musicae on the Brilliant label.

Biography and career 
Founded in 1992, Delitiae Musicae is an a cappella early music ensemble, performing vocal music from the Renaissance and Baroque periods. Led by Marco Longhini, the ensemble, based in Verona, Italy, has performed in many European classical music festivals, and has recorded a number of CDs for the Naxos label. In addition to recording the complete madrigals of Monteverdi (all 9 books), Delitiae Musicae completed the recording of the six books of madrigals of Gesualdo in 2013, and has made other recordings of works by Palestrina and Banchieri.

Discography
 Adriano Banchieri: Il Studio Dilettevole, CD
 Adriano Banchieri: La Pazzia Senile, CD
 Monteverdi: Madrigals Books 1 to 9
 Gesualdo: Madrigals Books 1 to 6

References

External links
 Delitiae Musicae's web site
 Delitiae Musicae's biography on the Naxos web site
 Marco Longhini's biography on the Naxos web site

Italian classical music groups